General Mathews or Matthews may refer to:

Bobby Mathews (general) (fl. 1970s–2020s), Indian Army lieutenant general
Bruce Matthews (Canadian Army officer) (1909–1991), Canadian Army major general
Francis Matthews (British Army officer) (1903–1976), British Army major general
George Mathews (soldier) (1739–1812), Continental Army brevet brigadier general
Joane Mathews (fl. 1980s–2020s), Wisconsin Army National Guard brigadier general
Richard Matthews (soldier) (died 1783), British East India Company general in the Second Anglo-Mysore War

See also
Attorney General Mathews (disambiguation)